Altai is a set of Turkic languages, spoken officially in the Altai Republic, Russia. The standard vocabulary is based on the Southern Altai language, though it's also taught to and used by speakers of the Northern Altai language as well. Gorno–Altai refers to a subgroup of languages in the Altai Mountains.The languages were called Oyrot (ойрот) prior to 1948.

Altai is spoken primarily in the Altai Republic. There is a small community of speakers in the neighbouring Altai Krai as well.

Classification
Due to its isolated position in the Altai Mountains and contact with surrounding languages, the classification of Altai within the Turkic languages has often been disputed. Because of its geographic proximity to the Shor and Khakas languages, some classifications place it in a Northern Turkic subgroup.
Due to certain similarities with Kyrgyz, it has been grouped as the Kyrgyz–Kipchak subgroup with the Kypchak languages which is within the Turkic language family. A classification by Talat Tekin places Southern Altai in its own subgroup within Turkic and groups the Northern Altai dialects with Lower Chulym and the Kondoma dialect of Shor.

Official status

Alongside Russian, Altai is an official language of the Altai Republic. The official language is based on the Southern Altai language spoken by the group called the Altay-Kiži, however in the few years it has also spread to the Northern Altai Republic.

Varieties
Though they are traditionally considered one language, Southern Altai is not fully mutually intelligible with the Northern varieties. According to modern classifications—at least since the middle of the 20th century—they are considered to be two separate languages.

Written Altai is based on Southern Altai, and according to Ethnologue is rejected by Northern Altai children. In 2006, a Cyrillic alphabet was created for the Kumandy variety of Northern Altai for use in Altai Krai.

Dialects are as follows:

Southern Altai
Altai proper
Mayma
Telengit
Tölös
Chuy
Teleut
Northern Altai
Tuba
Kumandy
Turachak
Solton
Starobardinian
Chalkan (also called Kuu, Lebedin)

Closely related to the northern varieties are Kondoma Shor and Lower Chulym, which have -j- for proto-Turkic inter-vocalic *d, unlike Mras Shor and Middle Chulym, which have -z- and are closer to Khakas.

Orthography
The language was written with the Latin script from 1928–1938, but has used Cyrillic (with the addition of 9 extra letters: Јј [d͡z~ɟ], Ҥҥ [ŋ], Ӧӧ [ø~œ], Ӱӱ [y~ʏ], Ғғ [ʁ], Ққ [q], Һһ [h], Ҹҹ [d͡ʑ], Ii [ɨ̹]) since 1938.

The letter Ÿ is sometimes used instead of Ӱ.

Missionary's Cyrillic alphabet 
The first writing system for Altai was invented by missionaries from the Altai Spiritual Mission in the 1840s; it was based on the Cyrillic alphabet and invented for the Teleut dialect and was used mostly for Church publications. The first books were printed in Altai not long thereafter and in 1868, the first Altaic Alphabet was published. There was no stable form of this alphabet, and it changed from edition-to-edition.

With this in mind, this is an inventory of some of these letters:

First Cyrillic alphabet (1922–1928) 
After the Bolshevik Revolution in 1917, publishing books into Altai was resumed in 1921, using a script similar to the Missionary's Alphabet. About this time, many post-revolution letters were adopted to better compose Russian words adopted into the language. As such, it took on this form (non-Russian letters emboldened):

Interestingly, in the same space, many considered adapting the old Mongolian Script for use in writing Altai.

Latin alphabet (1928–1938) 
The Latin Alphabet was eventually adopted and was used from 1922–1928. The final version of this alphabet was published in 1931, taking this form: 

The Latin letters correspond as follows to the modern Cyrillic letters:

Second Cyrillic alphabet (1938–1944) 

In 1938, the Central Research Institute of Language and Writing of the Peoples of the USSR began the project of designing a new alphabet for Altai, based on the Cyrillic script. Their new alphabet consisted of all 33 Russian letters, as well as the digraph 〈Дь дь〉 and the letter 〈Ҥҥ〉, for the phonemes /d͡ʒ/ and /ŋ/ respectively. However, this was later rejected, because it could not accurately represent all of Altai's phonological inventory.

To amend for this, the Institute's first revised alphabet saw the graphemes〈Ёё〉 and 〈Юю〉 for Altai's vowels /ø~œ/ and /y/ fall out of use, and the addition of two digraphs and two letters: 〈Дь дь〉 for /d͡ʒ/, 〈Нъ нъ〉for /ŋ/, 〈Ӧӧ〉 for /ø~œ/, and 〈Ӱӱ〉 for /y/. In the second revision, however, 〈Нъ нъ〉 was replaced with 〈Ҥҥ〉. Thus was born:

Altai speakers accepted the first variant, but generally preferred 〈Н' н'〉 over 〈Ҥҥ〉.

Modern Standard Altai alphabet 

Their second Cyrillic alphabet had many shortcomings, thus begging for a reform, which was carried out in 1944. The usage of  〈Ёё〉 and 〈Юю〉 /ø~œ/ and /y/ was dropped entirely, being replaced by the adoption of the Institute's second revision's usages of 〈Ӧӧ〉, and 〈Ӱӱ〉, for native words. 〈Дь дь〉 was dropped in favour of 〈Јј〉; for 〈Н' н'〉, they finally accepted 〈Ҥҥ〉.

The letters 〈Ёё〉, 〈Юю〉, and 〈Яя〉 are still used, though they are reserved for only non-native, Russian loan-words. So, in modern Standard Altai, the equivalent sounds are written: 〈йа〉, 〈йо〉 and 〈йу〉, for native words. So, words that were written: кая and коён, are now written as: кайа and койон.

Linguistic features 
The following features refer to the outcome of commonly used Turkic isoglosses in Northern Altai.

 */ag/ — Proto-Turkic */ag/ is found in three variations throughout Northern Altai: /u/, /aw/, /aʁ/.
 */eb/ — Proto-Turkic */eb/ is found as either /yj/ or /yg/, depending on the variety.
 */VdV/ — With a few lexical exceptions (likely borrowings), proto-Turkic intervocalic */d/ results in /j/.

Phonology
The sounds of the Altai language vary among different dialects.

Consonants

The voiced palatal plosive  varies greatly from dialect to dialect, especially in the initial position, and may be recognized as a voiced affricate . Even within dialects, this phoneme varies greatly.

Vowels
There are eight vowels in Altai. These vowels may be long or short.

Morphology and syntax

Pronouns 

Altai has six personal pronouns:

The declension of the pronouns is outlined in the following chart. 

Pronouns in the various dialects vary considerably. For example, the pronouns in the Qumandin dialect follow.

See also
 Telengits, Teleuts (names of related ethnic groups)
 Turkic peoples

References

External links

Altai Alphabet
Altai phrases (Archived 2009-10-25)
Russian–Altai Online Dictionary

Agglutinative languages
Siberian Turkic languages
Languages of Russia
Languages of China
Altai Mountains
Altai culture
Languages written in Cyrillic script